The Universidad Politécnica de Baja California (UPBC, Polytechnic University of Baja California) is a public state university in the state of Baja California. It was created by an executive order signed on January 9, 2006 and published in the official state newspaper on January 13 of that year.

Is a public institution of the State Government, that has a goal of imparting superior education in the levels of degree, technological specialization and other graduate studies, update courses in their different modalities, and also to serve to the development and progress of the society. Doing its function through three substantive areas, which are teaching, research and extension.

It began academic activities with 35 students on May 29, 2006, using a leased building in Mexicali, located at Calle de la Industria 291, Colonia Industrial. The campus for the university was later built in Av. Claridad S/N, Colonia Plutarco Elías Calles, with two academic buildings and one for workshops and laboratories, and a capacity of 2,000 students in two shifts. At the beginning of September 2010, the school enrolled 600 students in the four educational programs.

Programs 
 Power Engineering
 Information Technology Engineering
 Manufacturing Engineering Technology
 Mechatronics Engineering
 Animation and Visual Effects Engineering
 Small Business Administration and Management

External links 
 Universidad Politécnica de Baja California
 Coordinación de Universidades Politécnicas
 Map of the UPBC in Mexicali

Education in Mexicali
Public universities and colleges in Mexico
Universities and colleges in Baja California
2006 establishments in Mexico
Educational institutions established in 2006